The Front for a Country in Solidarity ( or ) was a center-left political coalition in Argentina. It was formed in 1994 out of the Broad Front (Frente Grande), which had been founded mainly by progressive members of the Peronist Justicialist Party who denounced the policies and the alleged corruption of the Carlos Menem administration; the Frente joined with other dissenting Peronists, the Unidad Socialista (Popular and Democratic Socialist Party) and several other leftist parties and individuals. Its leading figures were José Octavio Bordón, Carlos "Chacho" Álvarez and Graciela Fernández Meijide.

History
Shortly after the founding of the party, Bordón stood for President at the 1995 elections with Álvarez as running mate. The campaign was very successful, and Bordón came second with 33 percent of the vote. Subsequently, Bordón proposed converting FrePaSo into a unified party, while Álvarez wanted a loose confederation of different parties. On May 17, 1995, Bordón and Álvarez announced the formation of a confederation, with a unified political platform and leadership, with the third largest block in the Argentine National Congress. The Intransigent Party and the Christian Democratic Party joined the coalition. Bordón later resigned after a leadership battle and returned to the Justicialist Party.
The FrePaSo campaigned for the 1999 elections in an alliance with the larger Radical Civic Union (UCR) and a few provincial parties, which won the presidency for Fernando de la Rúa. Frepaso activist Aníbal Ibarra was elected Mayor of Buenos Aires in 2000 on the Alianza ticket - the Alliance for Work, Justice and Education. The alliance was effectively broken the next year, when vice-president Chacho Álvarez resigned amidst public intra-party accusations of bribery in the Senate, followed shortly after by other leading members.

After the 2001 elections FrePaSo became the joint third largest party in the federal Chamber of Deputies, with 17 of 257 deputies.
Subsequently the party disintegrated. Many members re-joined the Peronist movement within the centre-left Front for Victory faction of President Néstor Kirchner, with others supporting the ARI party of Elisa Carrió. Until 2007 the party nominally retained one senator, Vilma Ibarra, who sat as a lone 'Party for Victory' member but in practice supported the Front for Victory, for which she became a national deputy in 2007. Her brother Aníbal Ibarra was removed as Mayor of Buenos Aires in 2006 in the wake of the República Cromagnon nightclub fire.

Member parties

Notes

See also
Alliance for Work, Justice and Education (ALIANZA)
Carlos Chacho Álvarez
Darío Alessandro

References

 
Defunct political party alliances in Argentina
Political parties established in 1994
1994 establishments in Argentina
Political parties disestablished in 2001
2001 disestablishments in Argentina